Chris Jeter is an American attorney and politician serving as a member of the Indiana House of Representatives from the 88th district. He assumed office on August 26, 2020.

Early life and education 
Born and raised in Hamilton County, Indiana, Jeter attended Hamilton Southeastern High School. He earned a Bachelor of Arts degree in communication and media studies from Oklahoma Baptist University and a Juris Doctor from the George Washington University Law School.

Career 
Jeter served in the United States Navy Reserve for seven years, including as a legal advisor in the United States Navy Judge Advocate General's Corps. He later served as a law clerk in the Delaware Attorney General's Office. Jeter worked as an associate for Barnes & Thornburg and as a founding partner of Massillamany Jeter and Carson. He was elected to the Indiana House of Representatives in 2020.

References 

Living people
Republican Party members of the Indiana House of Representatives
People from Hamilton County, Indiana
Military personnel from Indiana
Oklahoma Baptist University alumni
George Washington University Law School alumni
Year of birth missing (living people)